Jann Jensen (born 22 February 1969) is a Danish football coach and a former player who is currently youth coach at OKS.

Honours
 Bundesliga runner-up: 1988–89, 1989–90
 DFB-Pokal finalist: 1990–91, 1994–95

References

External links
  
 DBU Profile

1969 births
Living people
Danish men's footballers
Denmark under-21 international footballers
Danish football managers
1. FC Köln players
VfL Wolfsburg players
Odense Boldklub players
Bundesliga players
2. Bundesliga players
Association football defenders
Dalum IF managers
Danish expatriate footballers
Danish expatriate sportspeople in West Germany
Danish expatriate sportspeople in Germany
Expatriate footballers in West Germany
Expatriate footballers in Germany
Denmark youth international footballers